Mai is a 2013 Indian Hindi-language film which marks the debut of veteran singer Asha Bhosle as a lead actress. The film is a family drama of how children abandon their ailing old parents. The film is also debut directorial venture of Mahesh Kodiyal.

Plot
Mai, a widowed mother of four, is a 65-year-old woman who lives with her only son Munna and suffers from Alzheimer's disease. When Munna gets an opportunity to move to USA for his job, he decides to admit Mai in an old age home. But Mai's eldest daughter Madhu objects to this. After the other two daughters also abandon Mai for various reasons, Madhu decides to bring Mai to her own home. Madhu's husband Subhash and teenage daughter Charu dislike this. After a series of events Madhu's family accepts Mai lovingly in their family.

Cast
 Asha Bhosle as Mai
 Padmini Kolhapure as Madhu, Mai's eldest daughter
 Ram Kapoor as Subhash Joshi, Mai's son-in-law, Madhu's husband, Charu's father
 Shivani Joshi as Charu, Madhu's daughter
 Kshitee Jog as Mai's second daughter
 Anupam Kher as the Doctor (Cameo role)

The film features veteran playback singer of India, Asha Bhosle, in the title role. Bhosle debuted through this film as an actress at the age of 79. Padmini Kolhapure, who is the real-life niece of Bhosle, played the role of her eldest daughter. Kolhapure, known for her roles in the films Insaaf Ka Tarazu (1980) and Prem Rog (1982), returned to films after a hiatus.

Bhosle dedicated the film to her mother, who was also lovingly called "Mai". About her acting experience she says that she did not find acting difficult but also states that this will be her "only experiment with acting".

Music
The songs of the film are penned by Manoj Tapadia and Sahil Sultanpuri. The score is composed by music director Nithin R Shankar, who has previously composed music for the 2007 film Bombay to Goa. Sahil Sultanpuri brings his first song "Dhakku Makum", Tapadia has previously written songs of the films Manorama Six Feet Under and Cheeni Kum, both of 2007. The song "Dhakku Makum" features the popular Marathi traditional song "Yere Yere Pausa" which is sung by Zanai Bhosle, Asha Bhosle's granddaughter. The song is a rain dance sequence choreographed by Lollypop, known for the choreography of "Aati Kya Khandala" and was released at Lalbaugcha Ganpati on 19 September 2012 on the occasion of Ganesh Chaturthi. The complete music album was released on 22 January 2013 by Sachin Tendulkar.

Reception

The film released for audiences on 1 February 2013 with a grand premier on the previous night at Cinemax, Versova. The premier was attended by notable personalities of Bollywood like Amitabh Bachchan, Shatrughan Sinha, Sridevi, Tanuja, and more.

The film proved to be average. In their review, various critics appreciated Bhosle's performance but criticised the film for clichéd plot. Filmfare also appreciated Bhosle by writing that she "weaves magic but not enough to save a mediocre movie".

References

External links
 
Nitin Shankar on IMDB 

2013 directorial debut films
2013 films
Indian films about Alzheimer's disease